Pollex silaui is a moth of the family Erebidae first described by Michael Fibiger in 2007. It is known from northern Sumatra.

References

Micronoctuini
Taxa named by Michael Fibiger
Moths described in 2007
Moths of Sumatra